The Federal Ministry for Economic Affairs and Climate Action, abbreviated BMWK (was BMWi), is a cabinet-level ministry  of the Federal Republic of Germany. It was previously known as the "Ministry of Economy". It was recreated in 2005 as "Ministry of Economics and Technology" after it had previously been merged with other ministries to form the Federal Ministry for Economics and Labour between 2002 and 2005. The ministry is advised by the Council of Advisors on Digital Economy.

History 
The historical predecessor of the current Federal Ministry for Economic Affairs and Climate Action was the Reichswirtschaftsamt (Reich Economic Office), founded in 1917. In 1919, this became the Reichswirtschaftsministerium (Reich Ministry of Economy), which existed until 1945.

In postwar occupied Germany, its functions were exercised by the Administrative Office of Economy between 1946 and 1949. After the founding of the Federal Republic of Germany, the Federal Ministry of Economics existed from 1949 to 1998. From May 1971 to December 1972, it was temporarily merged with the Federal Ministry of Finance, in the Federal Ministry of Economics and Finance. In 1998 the technology section of the Ministry of Research was added, making it the Federal Ministry of Economics and Technology. 

Between 2002 and 2005, it was merged with the Federal Ministry of Economics and Technology and one part of the Federal Ministry of Labour and Social Affairs - the other part being merged with the old Federal Ministry for Health, then the Ministry of Health and Social Security. This transformations aimed to consolidate the policy-fields of economics and labour market, on which the second term of chancellor Gerhard Schröder wanted to focus, into one hand. Because the new Ministry was very large and important, it was often referred to as a super-ministry (Superministerium) and its minister as a super-minister (Superminister). The creation of the new Ministry was widely seen as failed, basically because of the poor performance of the only office-holder Wolfgang Clement.

Under the following grand coalition headed by Angela Merkel, the portfolio reshuffle was reversed, and the old Federal Ministries of Economics and Technology, of Labour and Social Affairs and of Health were created once again as Federal Ministry of Economics and Technology. It was renamed to Federal Ministry for Economic Affairs and Energy in 2013.

Structure 

The Ministry is organised into 9 departments and one central department.
 Central Administration – Z
 Political Staff and Policy Planning - L
 European Policy – E
 Economic Policy – I
 Energy Policy: Heating and Efficiency – II
 Energy Policy: Electricity and Grid – III
 Industrial Policy – IV
 External Economic Policy – V
 Digital und Innovation Policy – VI
 SME Policy - VII

The ministry is headquartered in Berlin.

Agencies 
In addition to its own operations, the Ministry also oversees the following agencies:
 Federal Cartel Office
 Federal Network Agency
 Federal Office of Economics and Export Control
 Federal Institute for Materials Research and Testing
 Federal Institute for Geosciences and Natural Resources
 German National Metrology Institute

Ministers and Secretaries of State

Ministers 
Political Party:

Secretaries

Ministry for Economy (1949–1998) 
Parliamentary State Secretaries
 1967–1970: Klaus Dieter Arndt, SPD
 1970–1971: Philip Rosenthal, SPD
 1972: Rainer Offergeld, SPD
 1972–1987: Martin Grüner, FDP/DVP
 1983–1987: Rudolf Sprung, CDU
 1987–1989: Ludolf-Georg von Wartenberg, CDU
 1987–1993: Erich Riedl, CSU
 1989–1992: Klaus Beckmann, FDP
 1992–1998: Heinrich Leonhard Kolb, FDP
 1993–1994: Reinhard Göhner, CDU
 1994–1997: Norbert Lammert, CDU

State Secretaries
 1949–1951: Eduard Schalfejew
 1951–1963: Ludger Westrick, no party
 1958–1963: Alfred Müller-Armack, CDU
 1963–1966: Wolfram Langer
 1963–1968: Fritz Neef
 1967–1972: Johann Baptist Schöllhorn
 1968–1969: Klaus von Dohnanyi, SPD
 1969–1978: Detlev Karsten Rohwedder, SPD
 1972: Ernst Wolf Mommsen
 1973–1991: Otto Schlecht
 1979–1995: Dieter von Würzen
 1991–1994: Johann Eekhoff
 1994–1997: Johannes Ludewig
 1995–1998: Lorenz Schomerus
 1997–1998: Rudi Geil, CDU
 1997–1998: Klaus Bünger

Ministry for Economics and Technology (1998–2002) 
Parliamentary State Secretaries
 1998–2002: Siegmar Mosdorf, SPD

State Secretaries
 1998–2002: Alfred Tacke, SPD
 1999–2002: Axel Gerlach

Ministry for Economics and Labour (2002–2005) 
Parliamentary State Secretaries
 2002–2005: Gerd Andres, SPD
 2002–2005: Rezzo Schlauch, Greens
 2002–2005: Ditmar Staffelt, SPD

State Secretaries
 1999–2003: Axel Gerlach
 2002–2004: Alfred Tacke, SPD
 2002–2005: Rudolf Anzinger
 2002–2005: Georg-Wilhelm Adamowitsch
 2004–2005: Bernd Pfaffenbach

Ministry of Economics and Technology (2005–2013) 
Parliamentary State Secretaries
 2005–2013: Peter Hintze, CDU
 2005–2009: Dagmar Wöhrl, CSU
 2005–2009: Hartmut Schauerte, CDU
 2009–2013: Ernst Burgbacher, FDP
 2009–2013: Hans-Joachim Otto, FDP

State Secretaries
 2005–2006: Georg-Wilhelm Adamowitsch
 2005–2008: Joachim Wuermeling, CSU
 2006–2009: Walther Otremba
 2005–2011: Bernd Pfaffenbach
 2008–2012: Jochen Homann
 2009–2013: Bernhard Heitzer, FDP
 2011–2013: Stefan Kapferer, FDP
 2012–2013: Anne Herkes

Ministry for Economic Affairs and Energy (2013–2021) 
Parliamentary State Secretaries 
 2013–2017: Brigitte Zypries, SPD
 2013–2018: Uwe Beckmeyer, SPD
 2013–2018: Iris Gleicke, SPD
 2017–2018: Dirk Wiese, SPD
 2018–2019: Oliver Wittke, CDU
 2018–2020: Christian Hirte, CDU
 2018-2021: Thomas Bareiß, CDU
 2019–2021: Elisabeth Winkelmeier-Becker, CDU
 2020-2021: Marco Wanderwitz, CDU

State Secretaries
 since 2013: Rainer Baake, Greens
 since 2014: Matthias Machnig, SPD
 since 2013: Dr. Rainer Sontowski, SPD

Ministry for Economic Affairs and Climate Action (since 2021) 
Parliamentary State Secretaries 
 Since 2021: Franziska Brantner, Greens
 Since 2021: Oliver Krischer, Greens
 Since 2021: Michael Kellner, Greens
State Secretaries
 since 2021: Anja Hajduk, Greens
 since 2021: Sven Giegold, Greens
 since 2021: Udo Philipp
 since 2021: Patrick Graichen

References

External links
 

Economy
Economy of Germany
Germany
Germany
Germany
Germany